Solomon Upton (7 February 1891 – 1972) was an English professional footballer who played for Kettering Town, Tottenham Hotspur, Portsmouth and Plymouth Argyle.

Career 
Upton began his career at Kettering Town before joining Tottenham Hotspur in 1912. The outside right played on two occasions for the Lilywhites. After leaving White Hart Lane Upton went on to play for Portsmouth and finally Plymouth Argyle. Upton went on to play for Higham Town where he collected a winners' medal in the 1933 Maunsell Cup.

Family life
Upton served as an able seaman in the Royal Navy during the First World War and married Florence Winter in 1916. He became Mayor of Higham Ferrers in 1949.

References 

1891 births
1972 deaths
People from Higham Ferrers
English footballers
English Football League players
Kettering Town F.C. players
Tottenham Hotspur F.C. players
Portsmouth F.C. players
Plymouth Argyle F.C. players
Royal Navy personnel of World War I
Association football outside forwards
Mayors of places in Northamptonshire